The Marathi language has a long history of literature and culture. The first Marathi newspaper, Darpan, was started on 6 January 1832 by Balshastri Jambhekar. The paper was bilingual fortnightly also published in English as The Bombay Darpan and stopped publishing in 1840. Founded in 1881 by Bal Gangadhar Tilak, the daily Kesari was a prominent newspaper of the pre-Independence era with a large readership. It claimed to have circulation of 3500 within two years of establishment and reached up to 22,000 during 1908. Narayan Meghaji Lokhande's Marathi daily Din Bandhu, which focused on social causes of labour class, was the second largest circulation in Bombay Presidency with 1650 copies a week in 1884.

References

Marathi
Marathi